Typhoon Carmen was a powerful tropical cyclone that was the ninth of eleven super typhoons to occur during the 1965 Pacific typhoon season. On 7 October, seven Japanese fishing vessels capsized in the stormy seas. According to the Japan Coast Guard official confirmed report, 209 crewmen were killed.

References

External links 

Typhoons in Japan
1965 Pacific typhoon season
October 1965 events